Lisa Raymond and Samantha Stosur were the defending champions, but lost to  Peng Shuai and Sun Tiantian in the second round.

Seeds

* The top four seeds received a bye in the first round.

Draw

Final

Earlier rounds

Top half

Bottom half

External links

Charleston Open
Family Circle Cup